DSE may refer to:

Economy
 Dominant strategy equilibrium, an economic term in game theory

Stock exchanges
 Dar es Salaam Stock Exchange
 Dhaka Stock Exchange, the main Stock Exchange of Dhaka, Bangladesh
 Damascus Securities Exchange, the main Stock Exchange of Damascus, Syria

Government and administration
 Discover Science & Engineering, an Irish Government initiative
 Department of Sustainability and Environment in Victoria, Australia
 Data Services Environment, a service of the Defense Information Systems Agency, United States

Education
 Delhi School of Economics
 Disability Studies in Education
 Hong Kong Diploma of Secondary Education, an examination after completing secondary education in Hong Kong

Sports
 Dream Stage Entertainment, a Japanese company that promotes MMA and wrestling matches
 Dolphin South End Running Club, a San Francisco running club

Science and medicine
 DSE (gene), human gene which codes for dermatan-sulfate epimerase
 Dobutamine Stress Echo, a cardiac stress test
 Dark septate endophytes, a group of fungi that are symbiotic within vascular plant roots
 Design space exploration, systematic analysis and pruning of unwanted design points based on parameters of interest

Computing and electronics
 Dead Space: Extraction, a 2009 videogame available for the Nintendo Wii and the PlayStation 3
 Dick Smith Electronics, an electronics company

Other uses
 Dimokratikos Stratos Elladas, the Greek Civil War Communist army ('Democratic Army of Greece')
 Dry Sheep Equivalent, a standard unit frequently used in Australia
 Combolcha Airport in Ethiopia